Shahrak Emam (also Romanized as Shahrak Emām) is a village in Heshmatabad Rural District, in the Central District of Dorud County, Lorestan Province, Iran. At the 2006 census, its population was 2,369, in 647 families.

References 

Towns and villages in Dorud County